This article lists all-time records achieved in the NBA post-season in major categories recognized by the league, including those set by teams and individuals in single games, series, and careers. The NBA also recognizes records from its original incarnation, the Basketball Association of America.

Playoff records

Game
 Most minutes in a game
67 by Red Rocha and Paul Seymour, Syracuse Nationals at Boston Celtics on March 21, 1953 (4 OT)
 Most points in a playoff game
63 by Michael Jordan, Chicago Bulls at Boston Celtics on April 20, 1986 (2 OT)
 Most points in a half
39 by Sleepy Floyd, Golden State Warriors vs. Los Angeles Lakers on May 10, 1987 (2nd)
 Most points in a quarter
29 by Sleepy Floyd, Golden State Warriors vs. Los Angeles Lakers on May 10, 1987 (4th)
 Most points in an overtime period
17 by Stephen Curry, Golden State Warriors vs. Portland Trail Blazers on May 9, 2016
Note: this exceeds the regular season record of 16 by Gilbert Arenas
 Most field goals made in a game
24 by Wilt Chamberlain, Philadelphia Warriors vs. Syracuse Nationals on March 14, 1960
24 by John Havlicek, Boston Celtics vs. Atlanta Hawks on April 1, 1973
24 by Michael Jordan, Chicago Bulls vs. Cleveland Cavaliers on May 1, 1988
 Most field goals made in a game, no misses
14 by Chris Paul, Phoenix Suns vs. New Orleans Pelicans on April 28, 2022
 Most field goals attempted in a game
48 by Wilt Chamberlain, Philadelphia Warriors vs. Syracuse Nationals on March 22, 1962
48 by Rick Barry, San Francisco Warriors vs. Philadelphia 76ers on April 18, 1967
 Most field goals missed in a game
38 by Joe Fulks, Philadelphia Warriors vs. St. Louis Bombers on March 30, 1948 (8/46)
 Most field goals attempted in a game, none made
14 by Chick Reiser, Baltimore Bullets at Philadelphia Warriors on April 10, 1948
14 by Dennis Johnson, Seattle SuperSonics vs. Washington Bullets on June 7, 1978
 Most field goals made in a half
16 by Dave Bing, Detroit Pistons vs. Boston Celtics on April 1, 1968
 Most field goals attempted in a half
28 by Russell Westbrook, Oklahoma City Thunder vs. Houston Rockets on April 19, 2017
28 by Russell Westbrook, Oklahoma City Thunder vs. Utah Jazz on April 27, 2018
 Most field goals made in a quarter
12 by Sleepy Floyd, Golden State Warriors vs. Los Angeles Lakers on May 10, 1987
 Most field goals attempted in a quarter
18 by Russell Westbrook, Oklahoma City Thunder vs. Houston Rockets on April 19, 2017
Most consecutive field goals made in a quarter
12 by Sleepy Floyd, Golden State Warriors vs. Los Angeles Lakers on May 10, 1987
 Most consecutive field goals made in a game
14 by Chris Paul, Phoenix Suns at New Orleans Pelicans on April 28, 2022
 Most 3-point field goals made in a game
12 by Damian Lillard, Portland Trail Blazers at Denver Nuggets on June 1, 2021
 Most 3-point field goals made in a game, no misses
7 by Robert Horry, Los Angeles Lakers at Utah Jazz on May 6, 1997
 Most 3-point field goals attempted in a game
19 by Russell Westbrook, Oklahoma City Thunder vs Utah Jazz, April 27, 2018
 Most 3-point field goals made in a half
8 by Vince Carter, Toronto Raptors vs. Philadelphia 76ers on May 11, 2001
8 by Damian Lillard, Portland Trail Blazers vs. Denver Nuggets on May 24, 2021
 Most 3-point field goals attempted in a half
15 by Russell Westbrook, Oklahoma City Thunder vs Utah Jazz, April 27, 2018
 Most 3-point field goals made in a quarter
6 by Antoine Walker, Boston Celtics at Philadelphia 76ers on April 28, 2002
6 by Damian Lillard, Portland Trail Blazers vs. Denver Nuggets on May 24, 2021
6 by Michael Porter Jr., Denver Nuggets at Portland Trail Blazers on June 3, 2021
6 by Devin Booker, Phoenix Suns at Los Angeles Lakers on June 3, 2021
6 by Bojan Bogdanovic, Utah Jazz vs. Los Angeles Clippers on June 17, 2021
6 by Stephen Curry, Golden State Warriors vs. Boston Celtics on June 2, 2022
 Most consecutive 3-point field goals made in a half
8 by Vince Carter, Toronto Raptors vs. Philadelphia 76ers on May 11, 2001
 Most consecutive 3-point field goals made in a game
8 by Vince Carter, Toronto Raptors vs. Philadelphia 76ers on May 11, 2001
8 by Chris Paul, Los Angeles Clippers at Oklahoma City Thunder on May 5, 2014.
 Most free throws made in a game
30 by Bob Cousy, Boston Celtics vs. Syracuse Nationals on March 21, 1953 (4 OT) (30/32)
Note: this exceeds the regular season record of 28 by Wilt Chamberlain and Adrian Dantley
 Most free throws made in a game, no misses
24 by Dirk Nowitzki, Dallas Mavericks vs. Oklahoma City Thunder on May 17, 2011

 Most free throws attempted in a game
39 by Shaquille O'Neal, Los Angeles Lakers vs. Indiana Pacers on June 9, 2000 (18/39)
 Most free throws made in a half
19 by Magic Johnson, Los Angeles Lakers vs. Golden State Warriors on May 8, 1991
19 by Karl Malone, Utah Jazz vs. Portland Trail Blazers on May 9, 1991
19 by Charles Barkley, Phoenix Suns vs. Seattle SuperSonics on June 5, 1993
19 by Dirk Nowitzki, Dallas Mavericks vs. Oklahoma City Thunder on May 17, 2011
 Most free throws attempted in a half
28 by DeAndre Jordan, Los Angeles Clippers vs. Houston Rockets on May 10, 2015 (10/28)
 Most free throws made in a quarter
13 by Michael Jordan, Chicago Bulls vs. Detroit Pistons on May 21, 1991
13 by Dirk Nowitzki, Dallas Mavericks vs. Portland Trail Blazers on April 16, 2011
13 by Dirk Nowitzki, Dallas Mavericks vs. Oklahoma City Thunder on May 17, 2011
 Most free throws attempted in a quarter
25 by Shaquille O'Neal, Los Angeles Lakers vs. Portland Trail Blazers on May 20, 2000
 Most rebounds in a game
41 by Wilt Chamberlain, Philadelphia 76ers vs. Boston Celtics on April 5, 1967
 Most rebounds in a half
26 by Wilt Chamberlain, Philadelphia 76ers vs. San Francisco Warriors on April 16, 1967
 Most rebounds in a quarter
19 by Bill Russell, Boston Celtics vs. Los Angeles Lakers on April 18, 1962
Note: this exceeds the regular season record of 18 by Nate Thurmond
 Most offensive rebounds in a game
15 by Moses Malone, Houston Rockets vs. Washington Bullets on April 21, 1977 (OT)
 Most defensive rebounds in a game
20 by Dave Cowens, Boston Celtics at Houston Rockets on April 22, 1975
20 by Dave Cowens, Boston Celtics at Philadelphia 76ers on May 1, 1977
20 by Bill Walton, Portland Trail Blazers at Philadelphia 76ers, June 3, 1977
20 by Bill Walton, Portland Trail Blazers vs. Philadelphia 76ers, June 5, 1977
20 by Kevin Garnett, Minnesota Timberwolves vs. Denver Nuggets on April 21, 2004
20 by Kevin Garnett, Minnesota Timberwolves vs. Sacramento Kings on May 19, 2004
20 by Tim Duncan, San Antonio Spurs vs. Los Angeles Lakers on May 14, 2002
20 by Tim Duncan, San Antonio Spurs vs. Phoenix Suns on April 25, 2003
20 by Giannis Antetokounmpo, Milwaukee Bucks at Toronto Raptors on May 19, 2019
 Most assists in a game
24 by Magic Johnson, Los Angeles Lakers vs. Phoenix Suns on May 15, 1984
24 by John Stockton, Utah Jazz vs. Los Angeles Lakers on May 17, 1988
 Most assists in a half
15 by Magic Johnson, Los Angeles Lakers vs. Portland Trail Blazers on May 3, 1985
15 by Doc Rivers, Atlanta Hawks vs. Boston Celtics on May 16, 1988
15 by Steve Nash, Phoenix Suns vs. Los Angeles Lakers on April 29, 2007
 Most assists in a quarter
11 by John Stockton, Utah Jazz vs. San Antonio Spurs on May 5, 1994
 Most steals in a game
10 by Allen Iverson, Philadelphia 76ers vs. Orlando Magic on May 13, 1999
 Most blocks in a game
10 by Mark Eaton, Utah Jazz vs. Houston Rockets on April 26, 1985
10 by Hakeem Olajuwon, Houston Rockets vs. Los Angeles Lakers on April 29, 1990
10 by Andrew Bynum, Los Angeles Lakers vs. Denver Nuggets on April 29, 2012
 Most turnovers in a game
12 by James Harden, Houston Rockets vs. Golden State Warriors on May 27, 2015
 40-point scoring duos
45 by Elgin Baylor and 41 by Jerry West, Los Angeles Lakers vs. Detroit Pistons on March 29, 1962
42 by Sleepy Floyd and 41 by Hakeem Olajuwon, Houston Rockets vs. Dallas Mavericks on April 30, 1988
41 by Clyde Drexler and 40 by Hakeem Olajuwon, Houston Rockets vs. Utah Jazz on May 5, 1995
40 by Reggie Miller and Jalen Rose, Indiana Pacers vs. Philadelphia 76ers on May 6, 2000
41 by LeBron James and Kyrie Irving, Cleveland Cavaliers vs. Golden State Warriors on June 13, 2016
47 by Anthony Davis and 41 by Jrue Holiday, New Orleans Pelicans vs. Portland Trail Blazers on April 21, 2018
 Triple-double by teammates in the same game
Stephen Curry (37 points, 11 assists and 13 rebounds) and Draymond Green (18 points, 11 assists and 14 rebounds), Golden State Warriors at Portland Trail Blazers on May 20, 2019

Series
 Highest points per game average
46.3 by Jerry West, Los Angeles Lakers (vs. Baltimore Bullets), 1965
 3-game series
Most points - 135 by Michael Jordan, Chicago Bulls (vs. Miami Heat), 1992 (45.0 ppg)
Most minutes played - 144 by Wilt Chamberlain, Philadelphia Warriors (vs. Syracuse Nationals), 1961 (48.0 mpg)
Most field goals made - 53 by Michael Jordan, Chicago Bulls (vs. Miami Heat), 1992 (53/87, 60.9%)
Most field goals attempted - 104 by Wilt Chamberlain, Philadelphia Warriors (vs. Syracuse Nationals), 1960
Most 3-point field goals made - 14 by John Starks, New York Knicks (vs. Cleveland Cavaliers), 1996 (14/22, 63.6%)
Most 3-point field goals attempted - 35 by Reggie Miller, Indiana Pacers (vs. Milwaukee Bucks), 1999
Highest 3-point field goal percentage (min. 6 attempts) - 85.7% by Muggsy Bogues, 1997 (6/7)
Most free throws made - 43 by Kevin Johnson, Phoenix Suns (vs. Denver Nuggets), 1989 (43/46, 93.5%)
Most free throws attempted - 47 by Dolph Schayes, Syracuse Nationals (vs. Boston Celtics), 1959
Highest free throw percentage (min. 15 attempts) - 100% by Michael Jordan, Chicago Bulls (vs. Washington Bullets), 1997 (15/15)
Most rebounds - 84 by Bill Russell, Boston Celtics (vs. Syracuse Nationals), 1957 (28.0 rpg)
Most offensive rebounds - 28 by Moses Malone, Houston Rockets (vs. Seattle SuperSonics), 1982 (9.3 orpg)
Most assists - 48 by Magic Johnson, Los Angeles Lakers (vs. San Antonio Spurs), 1986 (16.0 apg)
Most steals - 13 by Clyde Drexler, Portland Trail Blazers (vs. Dallas Mavericks), 1990; Hersey Hawkins, Philadelphia 76ers (vs. Milwaukee Bucks), 1991 (4.3 spg)
Most blocks - 18 by Manute Bol, Golden State Warriors (vs. Utah Jazz), 1989 (6.0 bpg)
 4-game series
Most points - 150 by Hakeem Olajuwon, Houston Rockets (vs. Dallas Mavericks), 1988 (37.5 ppg)
Most minutes played - 195 by Wilt Chamberlain, Los Angeles Lakers (vs. Atlanta Hawks), 1970 (48.8 mpg)
Most field goals made - 65 by Kareem Abdul-Jabbar, Milwaukee Bucks (vs. Chicago Bulls), 1974
Most field goals attempted - 123 by Tracy McGrady, Orlando Magic (vs. Milwaukee Bucks), 2001
Most 3-point field goals made - 26 by Stephen Curry, Golden State Warriors (vs. Portland Trail Blazers), 2019
Most 3-point field goals attempted - 61 by Stephen Curry, Golden State Warriors (vs. Portland Trail Blazers), 2019
Highest 3-point field goal percentage (min. 8 attempts) - 81.8% by Bob Hansen, Utah Jazz (vs. Portland Trail Blazers), 1988
Most free throws made - 51 by Kobe Bryant, Los Angeles Lakers (vs. Sacramento Kings), 2001
Most free throws attempted - 68 by Shaquille O'Neal, Los Angeles Lakers (vs. New Jersey Nets), 2002
Most rebounds - 118 by Bill Russell, Boston Celtics (vs. Minneapolis Lakers), 1959 (29.5 rpg)
Most offensive rebounds - 27 by Moses Malone, Philadelphia 76ers (vs. Los Angeles Lakers), 1983
Most assists - 57 by Magic Johnson, Los Angeles Lakers (vs. Phoenix Suns), 1989 (14.3 apg)
Most steals - 17 by Lionel Hollins, Portland Trail Blazers (vs. Los Angeles Lakers), 1977 (4.25 spg)
Most blocks - 23 by Hakeem Olajuwon, Houston Rockets (vs. Los Angeles Lakers), 1990 (5.75 bpg)
 5-game series
Most points - 226 by Michael Jordan, Chicago Bulls (vs. Cleveland Cavaliers), 1988 (45.2 ppg)
Most minutes played - 242 by Kareem Abdul-Jabbar, Los Angeles Lakers (vs. Seattle SuperSonics), 1979 (48.4 mpg)
Most field goals made - 86 by Michael Jordan, Chicago Bulls (vs. Philadelphia 76ers), 1990
Most field goals attempted - 162 by Allen Iverson, Philadelphia 76ers (vs. Los Angeles Lakers), 2001
Most 3-point field goals made - 28 by Klay Thompson Golden State Warriors (vs. Portland Trail Blazers), 2016
Most 3-point field goals attempted - 56 by Klay Thompson, Golden State Warriors (vs. Portland Trail Blazers), 2016
Highest 3-point field goal percentage (min. 10 attempts) - 80.0% by Byron Scott, Los Angeles Lakers (vs. Golden State Warriors), 1991
Most free throws made - 66 by James Harden, Houston Rockets (vs. Oklahoma City Thunder), 2017
Most free throws attempted - 79 by Karl Malone, Utah Jazz (vs. Los Angeles Clippers), 1992
Most rebounds - 160 by Wilt Chamberlain, Philadelphia 76ers (vs. Boston Celtics), 1967 (32.0 rpg)
Most offensive rebounds - 36 by Larry Smith, Golden State Warriors (vs. Los Angeles Lakers), 1987
Most assists - 85 by Magic Johnson, Los Angeles Lakers (vs. Portland Trail Blazers), 1985 (17.0 apg)
Most steals - 21 by Micheal Ray Richardson, New Jersey Nets (vs. Philadelphia 76ers), 1984; Baron Davis, Charlotte Hornets (vs. New Jersey Nets), 2002; Baron Davis, Golden State Warriors (vs. Utah Jazz), 2007 (4.2 spg)
Most blocks - 31 by Dikembe Mutombo, Denver Nuggets (vs. Seattle SuperSonics), 1994 (6.2 bpg)
 6-game series

Most points - 278 by Jerry West, Los Angeles Lakers (vs. Baltimore Bullets), 1965 (46.3 ppg)
Most minutes played - 296 by Wilt Chamberlain, Philadelphia 76ers (vs. New York Knicks), 1968 (49.3 mpg)
Most field goals made - 101 by Michael Jordan, Chicago Bulls (vs. Phoenix Suns), 1993
Most field goals attempted - 235 by Rick Barry, San Francisco Warriors (vs. Philadelphia 76ers), 1967
Most 3-point field goals made - 35 by Damian Lillard, Portland Trail Blazers (vs. Denver Nuggets), 2021
Most 3-point field goals attempted - 67 by Stephen Curry, Golden State Warriors (vs. Toronto Raptors), 2019
Highest 3-point field goal percentage (min. 12 attempts) - 66.7% by Danny Ainge, Phoenix Suns (vs. Chicago Bulls), 1993
Most free throws made - 86 by Jerry West, Los Angeles Lakers (vs. Baltimore Bullets), 1965
Most free throws attempted - 97 by Dwyane Wade, Miami Heat (vs. Dallas Mavericks), 2006
Most rebounds - 171 by Wilt Chamberlain, Philadelphia 76ers (vs. San Francisco Warriors), 1967 (28.5 rpg)
Most offensive rebounds - 46 by Moses Malone, Houston Rockets (vs. Boston Celtics), 1981
Most assists - 90 by Johnny Moore, San Antonio Spurs (vs. Los Angeles Lakers), 1983 (15.0 apg)
Most steals - 19 by Rick Barry, Golden State Warriors (vs. Seattle SuperSonics), 1975 (3.17 spg)
Most blocks - 32 by Tim Duncan, San Antonio Spurs (vs. New Jersey Nets), 2003 (5.33 bpg)
 7-game series
Most points - 284 by Elgin Baylor, Los Angeles Lakers (vs. Boston Celtics), 1962 (40.6 ppg)
Most minutes played - 345 by Kareem Abdul-Jabbar, Milwaukee Bucks (vs. Boston Celtics), 1974 (49.3 mpg)
Most field goals made - 113 by Wilt Chamberlain, Philadelphia Warriors (vs. St. Louis Hawks), 1964
Most field goals attempted - 235 by Elgin Baylor, Los Angeles Lakers (vs. Boston Celtics), 1962
Most 3-point field goals made - 33 by Donovan Mitchell, Utah Jazz (vs. Denver Nuggets), 2020
Most 3-point field goals attempted - 80 by Stephen Curry, Golden State Warriors (vs. Cleveland Cavaliers), 2016
Highest 3-point field goal percentage (min. 12 attempts) - 61.1% by Brian Shaw, Los Angeles Lakers (vs. Portland Trail Blazers), 2000 (11/18)
Most free throws made - 83 by Dolph Schayes, Syracuse Nationals (vs. Boston Celtics), 1959
Most free throws attempted - 100 by Charles Barkley, Philadelphia 76ers (vs. Milwaukee Bucks), 1986
Most rebounds - 220 by Wilt Chamberlain, Philadelphia 76ers (vs. Boston Celtics), 1965 (31.4 rpg)
Most offensive rebounds - 45 by Wes Unseld, Washington Bullets (vs. San Antonio Spurs), 1979; Dikembe Mutombo, Philadelphia 76ers (vs. Milwaukee Bucks), 2001
Most assists - 115 by John Stockton, Utah Jazz (vs. Los Angeles Lakers), 1988 (16.4 apg)
Most steals - 28 by John Stockton, Utah Jazz (vs. Los Angeles Lakers), 1988 (4.0 spg)
Most blocks - 38 by Dikembe Mutombo, Denver Nuggets (vs. Utah Jazz), 1994 (5.43 bpg)

Playoff-Run 
Records through the 2021 playoffs.

Most points
759 by Michael Jordan, Chicago Bulls, 1992
Most personal fouls
102 by Dwight Howard, Orlando Magic, 2009
Most blocks
92 by Hakeem Olajuwon, Houston Rockets, 1994
Most steals
66 by Isiah Thomas, Detroit Pistons, 1988
Most assists
303 by Magic Johnson, Los Angeles Lakers, 1988
Most rebounds
444 by Wilt Chamberlain, Los Angeles Lakers, 1969

Career
Records through the 2022 NBA playoffs.
 Most games
266 by LeBron James
 Most minutes
11,035 by LeBron James
 Most minutes per game
47.24 by Wilt Chamberlain
 Most points
7,631 by LeBron James
 Highest points per game average (min. 25 games)
33.45 by Michael Jordan (179 games)
 Most 50-point games
8 by Michael Jordan
 Most 40-point games
38 by Michael Jordan
 Most 30-point games
118 by LeBron James
 Most 20-point games
237 by LeBron James
 Most 10-point games
264 by LeBron James
 Only player to score 15+ points in every game (min. 25 games)
Michael Jordan (179 games)
 Only player to record consecutive 50-point games
Michael Jordan scored 50 and 55 points in Games 1 and 2 of the 1988 Eastern Conference First Round (Chicago Bulls vs. Cleveland Cavaliers).
 Most consecutive 45-point games
3 by Michael Jordan (May 9–13, 1990)
 Most consecutive 40-point games
6 by Jerry West (April 3–13, 1965)
 Most consecutive 30-point games
17 by Rick Barry (April 12, 1967 – April 6, 1971)
 Most consecutive 20-point games
60 by Michael Jordan (June 2, 1989 – May 11, 1993)
Most consecutive 15-point games
179 by Michael Jordan. This streak spans every playoff game of Jordan's career.
Most consecutive 10-point games
179 by Michael Jordan. This streak spans every playoff game of Jordan's career.
 Most field goals made
2,725 by LeBron James
 Most field goals attempted
5,502 by LeBron James
 Highest field goal percentage (min. 300 attempts)
66.23% by DeAndre Jordan (202/305)
 Most field goals missed
2,777 by LeBron James
 Most 2-point field goals made
2,356 by Kareem Abdul-Jabbar
 Most 2-point field goals attempted
4,418 by Kareem Abdul-Jabbar
 Highest 2-point field goal percentage (min. 300 attempts)
66.77% by DeAndre Jordan (207/310)
 Most 3-point field goals made
561 by Stephen Curry
 Most 3-point field goals attempted
1,400 by Stephen Curry
 Highest 3-point field goal percentage (NBA Rate Statistic Requirement is min. 55 attempts)
50% by Bob Hansen (38/76)
 Most consecutive games with a 3-point field goal made
 132 by Stephen Curry (12 in 2013; 7 in 2014; 21 in 2015; 18 in 2016; 17 in 2017; 15 in 2018; 22 in 2019; 20 in 2022)
 Highest True Shooting Percentage (takes into consideration points scored from three-pointers, field goals and free throws to get a measure of points scored each shooting attempt, formula is Points / (2 * (FG Attempts + 0.44 * FT Attempts))) 
62.8% by Kawhi Leonard
 Highest Effective Field Goal Percentage (Similar to FG %, but adds an additional parameter. This parameter adjusts for the fact that 3-point field goals are worth 50 percent more than 2-point field goals. Formula is eFG% = (FGM + (0.5 x 3PTM)) / FGA)
66.77% by DeAndre Jordan
 Most free throws made
1,749 by LeBron James.
 Most free throws attempted
2,364 by LeBron James
 Highest free throw percentage (NBA Rate Statistic Requirement is min. 125 attempts)
94.39% by Mark Price (202/214)
 Most consecutive free throws made
72 by Stephen Curry, 2015-2019 Playoffs
 Most rebounds
4,104 by Bill Russell
 Highest rebounds per game average (min. 25 games)
24.9 by Bill Russell
 Highest total rebound percentage (Rebound %, an estimate of the percentage of missed shots a player rebounded while he was on the floor.)
21.84% Dwight Howard
 Most offensive rebounds
866 by Shaquille O'Neal
 Highest offensive rebound percentage
15.05% Moses Malone
 Most defensive rebounds
2,081 by Tim Duncan
 Highest defensive rebound percentage 
30.86% Dwight Howard
 Most Double-doubles
 164 by Tim Duncan
 Most Triple-doubles
 30 by Magic Johnson
 Most assists
2,346 by Magic Johnson
 Highest assists per game average (min. 25 games)
12.35 by Magic Johnson
 Highest assist percentage (Assist %, an estimate of the percentage of teammate field goals a player assisted while he was on the floor.)
47.79% John Stockton
 Most steals
454 by LeBron James
 Highest steals per game average  (NBA Rate Statistic Requirement is min. 125 steals) 
2.28 by Baron Davis (114 steals / 50 games)
 Highest steal percentage (Steal %, an estimate of the percentage of opponent possessions that end with a steal by the player while he was on the floor.)
3.76% Charlie Ward
 Most blocks
568 by Tim Duncan
 Highest blocks per game average (min. 25 games)
3.26 by Hakeem Olajuwon (472/145)
 Highest block percentage (Block %, an estimate of the percentage of opponent two-point field goal attempts blocked by the player while he was on the floor.)
7.91% Greg Ostertag
 Most turnovers
975 by LeBron James.
 Most personal fouls
797 by Kareem Abdul-Jabbar
 Highest Player Efficiency Rating (measuring a player's per-minute performance, while adjusting for pace)
28.60 by Michael Jordan
 Highest Offensive Rating (for players it is points produced per 100 possessions)  
129.63 by Tristan Thompson.
 Lowest Defensive Rating (for players and teams it is points allowed per 100 possessions.)
92.29 Ben Wallace

Rookie and age-related records
In 2006, the NBA introduced age requirement restrictions. Prospective high school players must wait a year before entering the NBA, making some age-related records harder to break.

 Youngest/Oldest player to play a playoff game
Youngest: Andrew Bynum is the youngest player to play in a playoff game, he logged a total of 1 minute and 52 seconds and missed one shot in the game for the Los Angeles Lakers against the Phoenix Suns at the age of 18 years, 191 days on May 6, 2006.
Oldest: Robert Parish is the oldest player to play in a playoff game, he logged about 8 minutes, grabbed 2 rebounds and missed all three shots in the game for the Chicago Bulls against the Atlanta Hawks at the age of 43 years, 254 days on May 11, 1997.
 Youngest/Oldest player to start in a playoff game
Youngest: Jonathan Kuminga is the youngest player to start in a playoff game, he logged a total of 17 minutes and 35 seconds, scored 18 points, grabbed 2 rebounds and had 1 assist in the game for the Golden State Warriors against the Memphis Grizzlies at the age of 19 years, 213 days on May 7, 2022.
Oldest: Kareem Abdul-Jabbar is the oldest player to start in a playoff game, he logged about 29 minutes, scored 7 points, grabbed 3 rebounds and had 3 assists in the game for the Los Angeles Lakers against the Detroit Pistons at the age of 42 years, 58 days on June 13, 1989, game 4 of the 1989 NBA Finals.
 Youngest/Oldest player to score in a playoff game
Youngest: Kobe Bryant is the youngest player to score in a playoff game, he had a total of 22 points in the game for the Los Angeles Lakers against the Portland Trail Blazers at the age of 18 years, 250 days on April 30, 1997.
Oldest: Robert Parish is the oldest player to score in a playoff game, he had a total of 2 points in the game for the Chicago Bulls against the Atlanta Hawks at the age of 43 years, 251 days on May 8, 1997.
 Youngest/Oldest player to score a 3-pointer in a playoff game
Youngest: Kobe Bryant is the youngest player to hit a 3-pointer in a playoff game, he had a total of 2 3-pointers in the game for the Los Angeles Lakers against the Portland Trail Blazers at the age of 18 years, 250 days on April 30, 1997.
Oldest: Manu Ginóbili is the oldest player to hit a 3-pointer in a playoff game, he had a total of 1 3-pointer in the game for the San Antonio Spurs against the Golden State Warriors at the age of 40 years, 270 days on April 24, 2018.
 Youngest/Oldest player to log a double-double in a playoff game
Youngest: Carmelo Anthony is the youngest player to log a double-double in a playoff game, he had a total of 24 points and 10 rebounds in the game for the Denver Nuggets against the Minnesota Timberwolves at the age of 19 years, 331 days on April 24, 2004.
Oldest:  Kareem Abdul-Jabbar is the oldest player to log a double-double in a playoff game, he had a total of 24 points and 13 rebounds in the game for the Los Angeles Lakers against the Detroit Pistons at the age of 42 years, 56 days on June 11, 1989, game 3 of the 1989 NBA Finals.
 Youngest/Oldest player to log a triple-double in a playoff game
Youngest: Magic Johnson is the youngest player to log a triple-double in a playoff game, he had a total of 13 points, 12 rebounds and 16 assists in the game for the Los Angeles Lakers against the Phoenix Suns at the age of 20 years, 238 days on April 8, 1980.
Oldest: John Stockton is the oldest player to log a triple-double in a playoff game, he had a total of 12 points, 11 rebounds and 10 assists in the game for the Utah Jazz against the Dallas Mavericks at the age of 39 years, 33 days on April 28, 2001.
 Youngest player to reach... (playoff career)
 1,000 Points – Kobe Bryant (22 years, 263 days) on May 13, 2001
 2,000 Points – Kobe Bryant (24 years, 257 days) on May 7, 2003
 3,000 Points – LeBron James (27 years, 162 days) on June 3, 2012
 4,000 Points – LeBron James (29 years, 134 days) on May 6, 2014
 5,000 Points – LeBron James (30 years, 175 days) on June 16, 2015
 6,000 Points – LeBron James (32 years, 161 days) on June 1, 2017
 7,000 Points – LeBron James (35 years, 246 days) on August 24, 2020
 1,000 Rebounds – Bill Russell (26 years, 50 days) on April 2, 1960
 2,000 Rebounds – Bill Russell (29 years, 63 days) on April 16, 1963
 3,000 Rebounds – Bill Russell (32 years, 67 days) on April 20, 1966
 4,000 Rebounds – Bill Russell (35 years, 72 days) on April 25, 1969
 500 Assists – Rajon Rondo (24 years, 106 days) on June 8, 2010
 1,000 Assists – Magic Johnson (25 years, 289 days) on May 30, 1985
 1,500 Assists – Magic Johnson (28 years, 259 days) on April 29, 1988
 2,000 Assists – Magic Johnson (30 years, 260 days) on May 1, 1990
 100 Steals – Magic Johnson (23 years, 253 days) on April 24, 1983
 200 Steals – Magic Johnson (25 years, 292 days) on June 2, 1985
 300 Steals – Magic Johnson (29 years, 259 days) on April 30, 1989
 400 Steals – LeBron James (33 years, 122 days) on May 1, 2018
 100 Blocks – Serge Ibaka (22 years, 254 days) on May 29, 2012
 200 Blocks – Serge Ibaka (26 years, 211 days) on April 16, 2016
 300 Blocks – Tim Duncan (30 years, 3 days) on April 28, 2006
 400 Blocks – Tim Duncan (32 years, 16 days) on May 11, 2008
 500 Blocks – Tim Duncan (37 years, 26 days) on May 21, 2013

NBA Finals records

Game
 Most minutes played in a game
62 by Kevin Johnson, Phoenix Suns (at Chicago Bulls) on June 13, 1993 (3 OT)
 Most minutes played in a game without a turnover
59 by Dan Majerle, Phoenix Suns (at Chicago Bulls) on June 13, 1993 (3 OT)
 Most points in a game
61 by Elgin Baylor, Los Angeles Lakers (at Boston Celtics) on April 14, 1962
 Most points in a half
35 by Michael Jordan, Chicago Bulls (vs. Portland Trail Blazers) on June 3, 1992
 Most points in a quarter
25 by Isiah Thomas, Detroit Pistons (at Los Angeles Lakers) on June 19, 1988
 Most field goals made in a game
22 by Elgin Baylor, Los Angeles Lakers (at Boston Celtics) on April 14, 1962
22 by Rick Barry, San Francisco Warriors (vs. Philadelphia 76ers) on April 18, 1967
 Most field goals attempted in a game
48 by Rick Barry, San Francisco Warriors (vs. Philadelphia 76ers) on April 18, 1967
 Most field goals attempted in a game, none made
14 by Dennis Johnson, Seattle SuperSonics (vs.  Washington Bullets) on June 7, 1978
 Most field goals made in a half
14 by Isiah Thomas, Detroit Pistons (at Los Angeles Lakers) on June 19, 1988
14 by Michael Jordan, Chicago Bulls (vs. Portland Trail Blazers) on June 3, 1992
14 by Michael Jordan, Chicago Bulls (vs. Phoenix Suns) on June 16, 1993
 Most field goals attempted in a half
25 by Elgin Baylor, Los Angeles Lakers (at Boston Celtics) on April 14, 1962
 Most field goals made in a quarter
11 by Isiah Thomas, Detroit Pistons (at Los Angeles Lakers) on June 19, 1988
 Most field goals attempted in a quarter
17 by Rick Barry, San Francisco Warriors (vs. Philadelphia 76ers) on April 14, 1967
 Most consecutive field goals made
13 by Michael Jordan, Chicago Bulls (vs. Los Angeles Lakers) on June 5, 1991 
 Most 3-point field goals made in a game
9 by Stephen Curry, Golden State Warriors (vs. Cleveland Cavaliers) on June 3, 2018
 Most 3-point field goals attempted in a game
17 by Stephen Curry, Golden State Warriors (vs. Cleveland Cavaliers) on June 3, 2018
 Most 3-point field goals made in a half
7 by Ray Allen, Boston Celtics (vs. Los Angeles Lakers) on June 6, 2010
 Most 3-point field goals attempted in a half
10 by John Starks, New York Knicks (vs. Houston Rockets) on June 22, 1994
 Most 3-point field goals made in a quarter
6 by Stephen Curry, Golden State Warriors (vs. Boston Celtics) on June 2, 2022

 Most 4-point plays made in a game
2 by Ray Allen, Miami Heat (vs. San Antonio Spurs) on June 16, 2013
 Most free throws made in a game
21 by Dwyane Wade, Miami (vs. Dallas Mavericks) on June 18, 2006 (OT)
 Most free throws made in a game, no misses
16 by Kawhi Leonard, Toronto Raptors (vs. Golden State Warriors) on June 2, 2019
 Most free throws attempted in a game
39 by Shaquille O'Neal, Los Angeles Lakers (vs. Indiana Pacers) on June 9, 2000 (18/39)
 Most free throws made in a half
13 by Shaquille O'Neal, Los Angeles Lakers (vs. Indiana Pacers) on June 9, 2000
 Most free throws attempted in a half
22 by Shaquille O'Neal, Los Angeles Lakers (vs. Indiana Pacers) on June 9, 2000
 Most free throws made in a quarter
10 by Stephen Curry, Golden State Warriors (vs. Cleveland Cavaliers) on June 4, 2017
10 by Paul Pierce, Boston Celtics (vs. Los Angeles Lakers) on June 15, 2008
 Most free throws attempted in a quarter
16 by Shaquille O'Neal, Los Angeles Lakers (vs. Indiana Pacers) on June 9, 2000
16 by Shaquille O'Neal, Los Angeles Lakers (vs. New Jersey Nets) on June 5, 2002
 Most rebounds in a game
40 by Bill Russell, Boston Celtics (vs. St. Louis Hawks) on March 29, 1960
40 by Bill Russell, Boston Celtics (vs. Los Angeles Lakers) on April 18, 1962 (OT)
 Most rebounds in a half
26 by Wilt Chamberlain, Philadelphia 76ers (vs. San Francisco Warriors) on April 16, 1967
 Most rebounds in a quarter
19 by Bill Russell, Boston Celtics (vs. Los Angeles Lakers) on April 18, 1962
 Most offensive rebounds in a game
11 by Elvin Hayes, Washington Bullets (vs. Seattle SuperSonics) on May 27, 1979
11 by Dennis Rodman, Chicago Bulls (vs. Seattle SuperSonics) on June 7, 1996
11 by Dennis Rodman, Chicago Bulls (vs. Seattle SuperSonics) on June 16, 1996
 Most defensive rebounds in a game
20 by Bill Walton, Portland Trail Blazers at Philadelphia 76ers, June 3, 1977
20 by Bill Walton, Portland Trail Blazers vs. Philadelphia 76ers, June 5, 1977
 Most steals in a game
7 by Robert Horry, Houston Rockets (at Orlando Magic) on June 9, 1995
 Most blocks in a game
9 by Dwight Howard, Orlando Magic (vs. Los Angeles Lakers) on June 11, 2009
 Most assists in a game
21 by Magic Johnson, Los Angeles Lakers (vs. Boston Celtics) on June 3, 1984
 Most assists in a half
14 by Magic Johnson, Los Angeles Lakers (vs. Detroit Pistons) on June 19, 1988
 Most assists in a quarter
8 by Bob Cousy, Boston Celtics (vs. St. Louis Hawks) on April 9, 1957
8 by Magic Johnson, Los Angeles Lakers (vs. Boston Celtics) on June 3, 1984
8 by Robert Reid, Houston Rockets (vs. Boston Celtics) on June 5, 1986
8 by Michael Cooper and Magic Johnson, Los Angeles Lakers (vs. Boston Celtics) on June 4, 1987
8 by Magic Johnson, Los Angeles Lakers (at Detroit Pistons) on June 16, 1988
8 by Magic Johnson, Los Angeles Lakers (vs. Detroit Pistons) on June 19, 1988
8 by John Stockton, Utah Jazz (at Chicago Bulls) on June 10, 1998
 Most turnovers in a game
10 by Magic Johnson, Los Angeles Lakers (vs. Philadelphia 76ers) on May 14, 1980
 40-point scoring duos
41 by LeBron James and Kyrie Irving, Cleveland Cavaliers (at Golden State Warriors) on June 13, 2016
 Most assists in a game without a turnover
17 by Robert Reid, Houston Rockets (vs. Boston Celtics) on June 5, 1986
 Triple-double by opposing players in the same game
Stephen Curry (32 points, 11 assists and 10 rebounds) and LeBron James (29 points, 14 assists and 11 rebounds), Cleveland Cavaliers at Golden State Warriors on June 4, 2017
 Most points by a duo in a loss
77 by LeBron James (39) and Kyrie Irving (38), Cleveland Cavaliers (vs. Golden State Warriors) on June 7, 2017
 Most points by a trio in a loss
93 by LeBron James (39), Kyrie Irving (38), and J.R. Smith (16), Cleveland Cavaliers (vs. Golden State Warriors) on June 7, 2017
 Four players score at least 30 points in a game
Hakeem Olajuwon (34), Sam Cassell (31), Houston Rockets and Shaquille O’Neal (33), Penny Hardaway (32), Orlando Magic on June 9, 1995
LeBron James (39), Kyrie Irving (38), Cleveland Cavaliers and Kevin Durant (31), Klay Thompson (30), Golden State Warriors on June 7, 2017
 Pair of 30-point scorers on the same team in consecutive games
Jerry West (40), Elgin Baylor (36), Los Angeles Lakers on April 8, 1962 and Elgin Baylor (39), Jerry West (36), Los Angeles Lakers on April 10, 1962
Kevin Durant (33), Stephen Curry (32), Golden State Warriors on June 4, 2017 and Kevin Durant (31), Klay Thompson (30), Golden State Warriors on June 7, 2017
LeBron James (39), Kyrie Irving (38), Cleveland Cavaliers on June 7, 2017 and Kyrie Irving (40), LeBron James (31), Cleveland Cavaliers on June 9, 2017

Series
 Most points per game in an NBA Championship series
41.0 by Michael Jordan, Chicago Bulls (vs. Phoenix Suns), 1993
 Triple-double per game average in the NBA Finals
LeBron James: 33.6 points, 12.0 rebounds, and 10.0 assists, Cleveland Cavaliers (vs. Golden State Warriors), 2017
 Only players to score at least 30 points in every game
Elgin Baylor, Los Angeles Lakers (vs. Boston Celtics), 1962 (7 games)
Rick Barry, San Francisco Warriors (vs. Philadelphia 76ers), 1967 (6 games)
Michael Jordan, Chicago Bulls (vs. Phoenix Suns), 1993 (6 games)
Hakeem Olajuwon, Houston Rockets (vs. Orlando Magic), 1995 (4 games)
Shaquille O'Neal, Los Angeles Lakers (vs. Indiana Pacers), 2000 (6 games)
Shaquille O'Neal, Los Angeles Lakers (vs. New Jersey Nets), 2002 (4 games)
Kevin Durant, Golden State Warriors  (vs. Cleveland Cavaliers), 2017 (5 games)
 4-game series
Most points - 145 by Shaquille O'Neal, Los Angeles Lakers (vs. New Jersey Nets), 2002 (36.3 ppg)
Most field goals made - 56 by Hakeem Olajuwon, Houston Rockets (vs. Orlando Magic), 1995
Most field goals attempted - 116 by Hakeem Olajuwon, Houston Rockets (vs. Orlando Magic), 1995
Most 3-point field goals made - 22 by Stephen Curry, Golden State Warriors (vs. Cleveland Cavaliers), 2018
Most 3-point field goals attempted - 53 by Stephen Curry, Golden State Warriors (vs. Cleveland Cavaliers), 2018
Highest 3-point field goal percentage - 66.7% by Derek Fisher, Los Angeles Lakers (vs. New Jersey Nets), 2002
Most rebounds - 118 by Bill Russell, Boston Celtics (vs. Minneapolis Lakers), 1959 (29.5 rpg)
Most offensive rebounds - 27 by Moses Malone, Philadelphia 76ers (vs. Los Angeles Lakers), 1983
Most assists - 51 by Bob Cousy, Boston Celtics (vs. Minneapolis Lakers), 1959 (12.8 apg)
Most steals - 14 by Rick Barry, Golden State Warriors (vs. Washington Bullets), 1975 (3.5 spg)
 5-game series
Most points - 178 by Allen Iverson, Philadelphia 76ers (vs. Los Angeles Lakers), 2001 (35.6 ppg)
Most field goals made - 66 by Allen Iverson, Philadelphia 76ers (vs. Los Angeles Lakers), 2001, and LeBron James, Cleveland Cavaliers (vs. Golden State Warriors), 2017
Most field goals attempted - 162 by Allen Iverson, Philadelphia 76ers (vs. Los Angeles Lakers), 2001
Most 3-point field goals made - 19 by Stephen Curry, Golden State Warriors (vs. Cleveland Cavaliers), 2017
Most 3-point field goals attempted - 49 by Stephen Curry, Golden State Warriors (vs. Cleveland Cavaliers), 2017
Highest 3-point field goal percentage - 68.8% by Isiah Thomas, Detroit Pistons (vs. Portland Trail Blazers), 1990
Highest free throw percentage - 100% by Bill Laimbeer, Detroit Pistons (vs. Portland Trail Blazers), 1990, and Vlade Divac, Los Angeles Lakers (vs. Chicago Bulls), 1991
Most rebounds - 144 by Bill Russell, Boston Celtics (vs. St. Louis Hawks), 1961 (28.8 rpg)
Most offensive rebounds - 31 by Shaquille O'Neal, Los Angeles Lakers (vs. Philadelphia 76ers), 2001
Most assists - 62 by Magic Johnson, Los Angeles Lakers (vs. Chicago Bulls), 1991 (12.4 apg)
Most steals - 14 by Michael Jordan, Chicago Bulls (vs. Los Angeles Lakers), 1991 (2.8 spg)
Most blocks - 20 by Dwight Howard, Orlando Magic (vs. Los Angeles Lakers), 2009 (4 bpg)
 6-game series
Most points - 246 by Michael Jordan, Chicago Bulls (vs. Phoenix Suns), 1993 (41.0 ppg)
Most field goals made - 101 by Michael Jordan, Chicago Bulls (vs. Phoenix Suns), 1993
Most field goals attempted - 235 by Rick Barry, San Francisco Warriors (vs. Philadelphia 76ers), 1967
Most 3-point field goals made - 31 by Stephen Curry, Golden State Warriors (vs. Boston Celtics), 2022
Most 3-point field goals attempted - 71 by Stephen Curry, Golden State Warriors (vs. Boston Celtics), 2022
Highest 3-point field goal percentage - 66.7% by Danny Ainge, Phoenix Suns (vs. Chicago Bulls), 1993
Highest free throw percentage - 97.8% by Reggie Miller, Indiana Pacers (vs. Los Angeles Lakers), 2000; Dirk Nowitzki, Dallas Mavericks (vs. Miami Heat), 2011
Most rebounds - 171 by Wilt Chamberlain, Philadelphia 76ers (vs. San Francisco Warriors), 1967 (28.5 rpg)
Most offensive rebounds - 46 by Moses Malone, Houston Rockets (vs. Boston Celtics), 1981
Most assists - 84 by Magic Johnson, Los Angeles Lakers (vs. Boston Celtics), 1985 (14.0 apg)
Most steals - 16 by Julius Erving, Philadelphia 76ers (vs. Portland Trail Blazers), 1977; Magic Johnson, Los Angeles Lakers (vs. Philadelphia 76ers), 1980; Larry Bird, Boston Celtics (vs. Houston Rockets), 1986; and Dwyane Wade, Miami Heat (vs. Dallas Mavericks), 2006 (2.67 spg)
Most blocks - 32 by Tim Duncan, San Antonio Spurs (vs. New Jersey Nets), 2003 (5.33 bpg)
 7-game series
Most points - 284 by Elgin Baylor, Los Angeles Lakers (vs. Boston Celtics), 1962 (40.6 ppg)
Most field goals made - 101 by Elgin Baylor, Los Angeles Lakers (vs. Boston Celtics), 1962
Most field goals attempted - 235 by Elgin Baylor, Los Angeles Lakers (vs. Boston Celtics), 1962
Most 3-point field goals made- 32 by Stephen Curry, Golden State Warriors (vs. Cleveland Cavaliers), 2016
Most 3-point field goals attempted - 80 by Stephen Curry, Golden State Warriors (vs. Cleveland Cavaliers), 2016
Highest 3-point field goal percentage - 55% by Danny Green, San Antonio Spurs (vs. Miami Heat), 2013
Highest free throw percentage - 95.9% by Bill Sharman, Boston Celtics (vs. St. Louis Hawks), 1957 (30/31)
Most rebounds - 189 by Bill Russell, Boston Celtics (vs. Los Angeles Lakers), 1962 (27.0 rpg)
Most assists - 95 by Magic Johnson, Los Angeles Lakers (vs. Boston Celtics), 1984 (13.6 apg)
Most steals - 20 by Isiah Thomas, Detroit Pistons (vs. Los Angeles Lakers), 1988 (2.86 spg)
Most blocks - 30 by Patrick Ewing, New York Knicks (vs. Houston Rockets), 1994 (4.29 bpg)

Career
 Most points
1,679 by Jerry West
 Highest points per game average (min. 10 games)
36.3 by Rick Barry (10 games)
 Most field goals made
612 by Jerry West
 Most field goals attempted
1,333 by Jerry West (45.91%)
 Most 3-point field goals made
152 by Stephen Curry
 Most 3-point field goals attempted
365 by Stephen Curry
 Highest 3-point field goal percentage (min. 40 attempts)
53.1% by Mike Miller (26/49)
 Most free throws made
455 by Jerry West
 Most free throws attempted
551 by Jerry West (82.58%)
 Highest free throw percentage (min. 100 attempts)
93.1% by Dirk Nowitzki (94/101)
 Most 40 point games
10 by Jerry West
 Most 30 point games
31 by Jerry West
 Most 20 point games
49 by Jerry West
 Most consecutive 40 point games
4 by Michael Jordan (June 11–18, 1993)
 Most consecutive 30 point games
13 by Elgin Baylor (April 9, 1959 – April 21, 1963)
 Most consecutive 20 point games
35 by Michael Jordan (June 2, 1991 – June 14, 1998). This streak entails every Finals game of Jordan's career.
 Only player to score 20+ points in all games (min. 15 games)
Michael Jordan (35 games)
 Most rebounds
1,718 by Bill Russell
 Highest rebounds per game average (min. 10 games)
24.6 by Wilt Chamberlain (35 games)
 Most offensive rebounds
125 by Tim Duncan
 Most defensive rebounds
454 by LeBron James
 Most assists
584 by Magic Johnson
 Highest assists per game average (min. 10 games)
11.7 by Magic Johnson (50 games)
 Most steals
102 by Magic Johnson
 Most blocks
116 by Kareem Abdul-Jabbar
 Most turnovers
217 by LeBron James
 Most games played
70 by Bill Russell
 Most personal fouls
225 by Bill Russell
 Most triple-doubles
11 by LeBron James

Franchise

 Most titles won
17 by the Boston Celtics
17 by the Los Angeles Lakers
 Most Finals appearances
32 by the Los Angeles Lakers
 Most Consecutive NBA titles
8 by the Boston Celtics (1959–66)
 Most Consecutive NBA Finals appearances
10 by the Boston Celtics (1957–66)
 Best NBA Finals series record
6–0 by the Chicago Bulls
 Most NBA Finals appearances without a title
3 by the Phoenix Suns (1976, 1993, 2021)
 Most Playoff appearances without a Finals appearance
29 by the Denver Nuggets
 Most Playoff appearances without a title
29 by the Denver Nuggets
29 by the Phoenix Suns
 Most Playoff appearances without a Conference Finals appearance
10 by the Charlotte Hornets
 Most consecutive Playoff appearances overall
22 by the Syracuse Nationals/Philadelphia 76ers (1950–71)
22 by the San Antonio Spurs (1998–2019)
 Most consecutive Playoff appearances in one city
22 by the San Antonio Spurs (1998–2019)
 Longest active streak of playoff appearances
8 by the Boston Celtics (2015–present)
 Fewest Playoff appearances
8 by the New Orleans Pelicans
 Most seasons without a Playoff appearance
35 by the Golden State Warriors
 Most consecutive seasons without a Playoff appearance
16 by the Sacramento Kings (2007–22)
 Fewest seasons without a Playoff appearance
6 by the San Antonio Spurs (Joined NBA in 1976)
 Best home record (Playoffs)
39–7 by the Chicago Bulls at the United Center
 Highest playoff winning percentage
0.941 by the Golden State Warriors (16–1) in 2017
 Undefeated in playoffs at home
9–0 by the Golden State Warriors in 2017
 Largest comebacks
31 points - The Los Angeles Clippers overcame a 94–63 deficit in the 3rd quarter to beat the Golden State Warriors on the road on April 15, 2019.

Playoffs
 Most 3-point field goals made in a game
25 by the Cleveland Cavaliers vs. Atlanta Hawks, Game 2, on May 4, 2016
 Most 3-point field goals made in a half
18 by the Cleveland Cavaliers vs. Atlanta Hawks, Game 2 in the first half, on May 4, 2016
 Most 3-point field goals made in a quarter
10 by the Cleveland Cavaliers vs. Atlanta Hawks, Game 2 in the second quarter, on May 4, 2016
10 by the Milwaukee Bucks vs. Miami Heat, Game 2 in the first quarter, on May 24, 2021
 Largest margin of points in a half* 41 by the Cleveland Cavaliers vs Boston Celtics on May 19, 2017
 Largest margin of victory in a game* 
58 by the Minneapolis Lakers vs. St. Louis Hawks on March 19, 1956
58 by the Denver Nuggets vs. New Orleans Hornets on April 27, 2009
 Highest field goal percentage in a game 
63.1% by the Los Angeles Clippers vs. Dallas Mavericks on August 25, 2020
 Most consecutive wins
15 by the Golden State Warriors from April 16, 2017 to June 9, 2017. 
 Largest average point differential
+14.5 PPG by the Milwaukee Bucks in 1971
 Most double-digit wins in a single postseason
12 each, by the Miami Heat in 2013;
 by the San Antonio Spurs in 2014;
 by the Cleveland Cavaliers in 2016;
 by the Golden State Warriors in 2017.
 Most consecutive road wins to begin postseason
8 by the Los Angeles Lakers in 2001
 Most points in a game
157 by the Boston Celtics (vs. New York Knicks) on April 28, 1990
 Most points in a half
87 by the Milwaukee Bucks (vs. Denver Nuggets) on April 23, 1978
 Most points in a quarter
51 by the Los Angeles Lakers (vs. Detroit Pistons) on March 31, 1962
51 by the Philadelphia 76ers (vs. Brooklyn Nets) on April 15, 2019
 Most points in an overtime period
22 by the Los Angeles Lakers (vs. New York Knicks) on May 1, 1970
 Most points off bench
100 by the Toronto Raptors (vs. Brooklyn Nets) on August 23, 2020
 Fewest points in a game
54 by the Utah Jazz (vs. Chicago Bulls) on June 7, 1998
 Fewest points in a half
23 by the Utah Jazz (vs. Chicago Bulls) on June 7, 1998
23 by the Phoenix Suns (vs. Los Angeles Lakers) on May 16, 2000
23 by the Cleveland Cavaliers (vs. Detroit Pistons) on May 21, 2006
23 by the Boston Celtics (vs. New York Knicks) on April 23, 2013
 Fewest points in a quarter
5 by the Portland Trail Blazers (vs. Utah Jazz) on May 18, 1999
 Fewest points in an overtime period
0 by the Minneapolis Lakers (vs. Fort Wayne Pistons) on March 22, 1955
0 by the Boston Celtics (vs. Indiana Pacers) on April 29, 2003

NBA Finals
 Most 3-point field goals made in a game
24 by the Cleveland Cavaliers (vs. Golden State Warriors) Game 4 on June 9, 2017
 Most 3-point field goals made in a half
13 by the Cleveland Cavaliers (vs. Golden State Warriors) Game 4 on June 9, 2017 (1st Half)
 Most 3-point field goals made in a quarter
9 by the Golden State Warriors (vs. Cleveland Cavaliers) Game 3 on June 7, 2017 (1st)
 Largest margin of victory in a game
42 by the Chicago Bulls (vs. Utah Jazz) on June 7, 1998
 Largest average point differential, series
 +15.0 PPG by the Golden State Warriors in 2018
 Highest field goal percentage in a half
75.8% by the San Antonio Spurs (vs. Miami Heat) Game 3 on June 10, 2014 (1st half)
 Highest field goal percentage in a game
63% by the Orlando Magic (vs. Los Angeles Lakers) Game 3 on June 9, 2009
 Only team to win series after facing a 3–1 series deficit
Cleveland Cavaliers, 2016 NBA Finals
 Fewest turnovers in a game
4 by the Detroit Pistons (vs. San Antonio Spurs) on June 16, 2005
4 by the San Antonio Spurs (vs. Miami Heat) on June 6, 2013
4 by the Golden State Warriors (vs. Cleveland Cavaliers) on June 1, 2017
 Largest turnover differential in a game
-16 by the Golden State Warriors (vs. Cleveland Cavaliers) on June 1, 2017
 Most points in a game
148 by the Boston Celtics (vs. Los Angeles Lakers) on May 27, 1985
 Most points in a half
86 by the Cleveland Cavaliers (vs. Golden State Warriors) on June 9, 2017 (1st Half)
 Most points in a quarter
49 by the Cleveland Cavaliers (vs. Golden State Warriors) on June 9, 2017 (1st)
 Fewest points in a game
54 by the Utah Jazz (vs. Chicago Bulls) on June 7, 1998
 Fewest points in a half
23 by the Utah Jazz (vs. Chicago Bulls) on June 7, 1998 (2nd Half)
 Fewest points in a quarter
7 by the Dallas Mavericks (vs. Miami Heat) on June 15, 2006 (4th)

Other records
 Most NBA titles won by a player
11 by Bill Russell
 Most consecutive NBA Finals appearances by a player
10 by Bill Russell (1957–66)
 Best record for NBA Finals series outcomes
8–0 by K.C. Jones, Satch Sanders, and John Havlicek
 Only players to win an Olympic gold medal, NCAA title, and NBA title
Clyde Lovellette — Olympics, 1952; NCAA, 1952; NBA, 1954, 1963–64
Bill Russell — Olympics, 1956; NCAA, 1955–56; NBA, 1957, 1959–66, 1968–69
K.C. Jones — Olympics, 1956; NCAA, 1955–56; NBA, 1959–66
Jerry Lucas — Olympics, 1960; NCAA, 1960; NBA, 1973
Quinn Buckner — Olympics, 1976; NCAA, 1976; NBA, 1984
Michael Jordan — Olympics, 1984, 1992; NCAA, 1982; NBA, 1991–93, 1996–98
Magic Johnson — Olympics, 1992; NCAA, 1979; NBA, 1980, 1982, 1985, 1987–88
Anthony Davis — Olympics, 2012; NCAA, 2012; NBA, 2020
 Only players to win an Olympic gold medal, EuroLeague/European Champions Cup, and NBA title

Bill Bradley — Olympics, 1964; European Champions Cup, 1966; NBA, 1970, 1973
Manu Ginóbili — Olympics, 2004; Euroleague, 2001; NBA, 2003, 2005, 2007, 2014
 Only 8th seeded teams to advance in Playoffs
5-game format
The Denver Nuggets eliminated the Seattle SuperSonics 3–2 in the First Round in the 1994 NBA Playoffs.
The New York Knicks eliminated the Miami Heat 3–2 in the First Round in the 1999 NBA Playoffs (lockout shortened season). In addition, New York became the only 8th seed to reach the NBA Finals, but lost in 5 to the San Antonio Spurs.
7-game format
The Golden State Warriors eliminated the Dallas Mavericks 4–2 in the First Round in the 2007 NBA Playoffs.
The Memphis Grizzlies eliminated the San Antonio Spurs 4–2 in the First Round in the 2011 NBA Playoffs.
The Philadelphia 76ers eliminated the Chicago Bulls 4–2 in the First Round in the 2012 NBA Playoffs (lockout shortened season).

Awards
 Most Bill Russell NBA Finals Most Valuable Player Awards*
6 by Michael Jordan
 Most Bill Russell NBA Finals Most Valuable Player Awards wins in a row*
3 by Michael Jordan (twice) and Shaquille O'Neal.

* This award has only been given since the 1968–69 season.

See also

 List of NBA players with most championships
 List of National Basketball Association players with 50 or more points in a playoff game
 List of NBA franchise post-season droughts
 List of NBA franchise post-season streaks
 List of NBA regular season records
 List of NBA All-Star Game records

Footnotes

References
 
 
 
 Playoffs record from USAToday
 Finals record from USAToday

National Basketball Association lists

ca:Rècords de l'NBA
es:Anexo:Récords NBA
fr:Records NBA
it:Record NBA
lt:Sąrašas:NBA rekordai
zh:NBA紀錄